The Fokker C.I was a German reconnaissance biplane under development at the end of World War I. The design was essentially an enlarged Fokker D.VII fighter with two seats and a 138 kW (185 hp) BMW IIIa engine. The C.I was originally developed to sell to the German Army. It never saw service in World War I, but Anthony Fokker managed to smuggle parts out of Germany at the time of the Armistice.

Development
The prototype,  V.38, was tested at Schwerin, and put into immediate production. After the armistice, production continued in the Netherlands.

Operators
The C.I went into Dutch service after 16 were ordered in February 1919. The USSR bought 42 C.Is. The C.Is served in the reconnaissance and trainer roles. The last C.I left service in 1936.

 
 Royal Danish Air Force
 
 Luftstreitkrafte
 
 Royal Netherlands Navy
 Dutch Army Aviation
 
 United States Navy - Two aircraft were purchased by US Navy in 1921.
 
 Soviet Air Force

Variants
V 38
Prototype.
C.I
Two-seat reconnaissance aircraft, powered by a 138 kW (185 hp) BMW IIIa piston engine.
C.Ia
Improved version.
C.IW 
Experimental floatplane version.
C.II 
Three-seat passenger transport version, powered by a 138 kW (185 hp) BMW IIIa piston engine. 
C.III 
Two-seat advanced trainer version of the C.I, powered by a 164 kW (220 hp) Hispano-Suiza 8B engine.

Specifications (Fokker C.I)

References

 
 

1910s German military reconnaissance aircraft
C 01
Single-engined tractor aircraft
Biplanes
Aircraft first flown in 1918